Helter Skelter is a 1949 British romantic comedy film directed by Ralph Thomas and starring Carol Marsh, David Tomlinson and Mervyn Johns. A radio star becomes involved with a wealthy heiress. The title is a common expression to describe a situation of "chaotic and disorderly haste".

The recurring English comic characters Charters and Caldicott also appeared in the film.

Plot
Susan Graham is a discontented heiress whose joint guardians are both trying to get her married to their odious nephews. On her nineteenth birthday, the five of them visit a nightclub called the Magnolia Club; also present happens to be radio star Nick Martin, whom Susan detests. When she is inadvertently seated at Martin's table directly in front of the floor show, she refuses to move, and Martin, despite his radio reputation as a fearless detective, is too intimidated by her hauteur to insist. This, however, proves to be a mixed blessing for Susan; when the evening's principal performer, a ventriloquist, comes out, she laughs so hard at his routine that she gets a bad case of the hiccups. She attempts to cure them by getting a drink of water, but succeeds only in getting caught in the crossfire of a pie fight.

Four days later, Susan's hiccups still haven't stopped, and her doctor recommends that her guardians take her to a certain haunted house for a good fright. On the way, they stop at a pub for directions, and Susan runs into Nick Martin again. At first, she is still chilly towards him, but then the narrator shoots the two of them with Cupid's arrow, and they immediately fall in love. Martin's overbearing mother, however, soon comes to take him away – but not before the two of them have arranged a rendezvous.

The plot then proceeds to the haunted house, where Susan's guardians, not believing in the ghost, have hired an actor to play the part. Susan, however, slips away to her rendezvous before he begins working; consequently, she still has the hiccups when Mrs Martin finds her and Nick trysting together. This fact doesn't amuse Mrs Martin, who apparently believes that hiccups are contagious; she forbids Susan to see her son again, and suggests that she see a psychiatrist about her problem.

The psychiatrist concludes that, because Susan got the hiccups from laughing, she can rid herself of them if she laughs that hard again. He recommends “a fellow on a BBC show called Jimmy Edwards”; Susan accordingly goes to the BBC studios, where, naturally enough, she meets Nick again. The two of them arrange a date at the Magnolia Club, ostensibly so Susan can cure her hiccups by laughing at the ventriloquist again, but really so they can gaze into each other's eyes all night. Their reverie is interrupted, however, by Mrs Martin, who shows up at the club and orders her son home. When Nick fails to stand up to her, Susan, disgusted, storms out of the club, inspiring Nick, a little too late, to develop a backbone and tell his mother off.

Returning home, Susan writes a letter to Nick breaking off their relationship, but the Martin address turns out to be unlisted. She therefore returns to the BBC and leaves the letter on his microphone; on her way back out, however, she mistakes the door and ends up locking herself in a cupboard. The next morning, she turns up missing; Nick, frantic, sets all of England looking for her, and at first refuses to broadcast until she's found. Being persuaded, however, that his programme is necessary for the social stability of the nation, he returns to the BBC that evening; in the course of the broadcast, the cupboard door is opened, and Susan tumbles out, unconscious. She is, however, quickly revived – and, what is more, when she sees her guardians’ nephews (who have inadvertently locked themselves into, and then flooded, the mixing room), she bursts out laughing, thereby finally curing herself of the hiccups. She and Nick fall into each other's arms, and all ends happily.

Stand-alone segments

Helter Skelter is as much a variety programme as it is a narrative film; it includes numerous scenes that have only the faintest connection with the plot, and are included principally for their stand-alone comedy value. The following are noteworthy:
 
The ventriloquist routine that gives Susan the hiccups is shown in full; it features Robert Lamouret and a duck puppet named Dudule.
While Susan is being shown her bedroom at the haunted house, the maid (Patricia Raine) has a fantasy in which she becomes a notorious 17th century courtesan, the romantic interest of both Oliver Cromwell (Bill Fraser) and King Charles II (Jon Pertwee).
In a vain attempt to make Susan laugh, the psychiatrist shows her scenes from a silent-comedy film starring Walter Forde, involving four spies trying to seize an inventor's briefcase.
During Susan's first trip to the BBC, Terry-Thomas is shown as a frantic disc jockey whose assistant has broken the record he was supposed to play; in desperation, he attempts to sing the song himself, despite sounding nothing like the original recording artist. (This would later become a staple routine of Thomas's, known as the "Technical Hitch" sketch.)

Cast

 Carol Marsh as Susan Graham
 David Tomlinson as Nick Martin
 Mervyn Johns as Ernest Bennett
 Peter Hammond as Spencer Stone
 Richard Hearne as Professor Pastry
 Peter Haddon as Major Basil Beagle
 Geoffrey Sumner as Humphrey Beagle
 Jon Pertwee as Headwaiter / Charles II
 Zena Marshall as Giselle
 Terry-Thomas as himself
 Jimmy Edwards as Dr. James Edwards
 Colin Gordon as Chadbeater Longwick
 Judith Furse as Mrs. Martin
 Edmund Willard as Ezekial
 Harry Secombe as Alf (uncredited)
 Henry Kendall as Lord Bruce Carlton
 Wilfrid Hyde-White as Dr Jekyll/Mr Hyde
 Patricia Raine as Maid/Amber
 Bill Fraser as Oliver Cromwell
 George Benson as Temporary Waiter
 Ronald Adam as Director General of the BBC

Production
Director Ralph Thomas called the film "one of those 'Friday night pictures'" he made under Sydney Box. "You were quite likely to finish shooting on Friday, plan to go into the cutting rooms on Monday to look over your stuff and get your cut ready, then go for a drink, and you'd be given another script and be told, 'The sets are standing and you start on Monday - this is the cast!' It wasn't necessarily good and we didn't get a lot of money, but it was regular."

Thomas did not "particularly want to make comedies, but I said I'd enormously admired a crazy American picture called Hellzapoppin! We cast it well and enjoyed making it, although I never quite understood the storyline. Funnily enough it has become a sort of cult picture in odd places."

Associate producer Alfred Roome called it "terrible, you couldn't do anything with that."

References

External links

Helter Skelter at Britmovie

1949 films
1949 romantic comedy films
1940s English-language films
British romantic comedy films
1940s fantasy comedy films
Films directed by Ralph Thomas
British black-and-white films
Cultural depictions of Charles II of England
Cultural depictions of Oliver Cromwell
British haunted house films
1940s British films